Banco Amambay is a Paraguayan bank established in 1992. It is part of president Horacio Cartes' Grupo Cartes business conglomerate. It is headquartered in Asunción  and had assets of $333.4 million and equity of $51.1 million as of June 2012. As of June 2012 Banco Amambay had around 2.8% of Paraguay's deposits (the 13th-largest by loan size), with its top 20 depositors accounting for 61% of its deposits.

References

External links
Banco Amambay website

Banks of Paraguay
Banks established in 1992
Paraguayan brands